Springsure was a Legislative Assembly electorate in the state of Queensland.

History
Springsure was created by the Electoral Districts Act in 1872, but the seat existed for only the one Parliament before being abolished in the 1877 redistribution.

Members
The following people represented Springsure:

See also
 Electoral districts of Queensland
 Members of the Queensland Legislative Assembly by year
 :Category:Members of the Queensland Legislative Assembly by name

References

Former electoral districts of Queensland
1873 establishments in Australia
1878 disestablishments in Australia
Constituencies established in 1873
Constituencies disestablished in 1873